Clay Jam is a claymation mobile game created by UK developer Fat Pebble and published by Zynga for iOS and Android mobile devices. It was released on November 29, 2012 on iOS and Android.  The handmade, stop-motion game was created in a UK garage by Fat Pebble developers. In the game, players guide a clay ball over a series of hills with the objective of squashing monsters on the way down. As of November 2018 the game is no longer available on the Google Play Store, along with Play-Doh Jam, their Play-Doh-related sequel, which is still unavailable on the App Store.

As of November 22, 2021, the app has been brought back and updated on the App Store.

Gameplay 
The goal of the game is to squash as many clay monsters as possible. As the clay ball rolls down a hill, the ball grows larger and rolls faster as it squashes beasts. As the ball nears the end of the course, players try to flick it as far as possible. The further the ball goes, the more points a player scores, enabling them to unlock new levels, themes and monsters. The game includes a total of 130 quests and five hills to master.

The base game is free to play, and all the content can be unlocked by playing the game or through in-app purchases.

Development 
Clay Jam is Brighton, England-based developer Fat Pebble's first game as an independent studio. To produce the game's graphics, art director Chris Roe modeled monsters out of 44 pounds of clay and used 400 toothpicks to scaffold the designs. Roe created the claymation scenes in his garage, taking 2040 stop-motion frames. Everyday objects were used to create the sound effects and local musicians were employed to produce the game's music. Zynga published Clay Jam on November 29, 2012, for iOS and Android as its first claymation title. The game is the fifth title in the Zynga Partners for Mobile program, Zynga's effort to help third parties publish mobile games while increasing Zynga's presence on mobile devices. Launched in June 2012, the partnership includes Fat Pebble, Atari, Crash Lab, Phosphor Games Studio and Sava Transmedia.

References

External links 
 

2012 video games
Android (operating system) games
Clay animation video games
Free-to-play video games
IOS games
Multiplayer and single-player video games
Video games developed in the United Kingdom
Zynga